The eighteenth season of The Ellen DeGeneres Show (often stylized as ellen18) began airing on Monday, September 21, 2020.

Episodes

References

External links
 

18
2020 American television seasons
2021 American television seasons
Television series impacted by the COVID-19 pandemic